Two ships of the United States Navy have been named USS Utah in honor of the 45th state.

 , a  currently authorized for construction

United States Navy ship names